Achong is a surname. Notable people with the surname include:

Bert Achong (1928–1996), Trinidad and Tobago pathologist
Ellis Achong (1904–1986), Trinidad and Tobago cricketer and umpire